"Cat's in the Cradle" is a 1974 folk rock song by Harry Chapin from the album Verities & Balderdash. The single topped the US Billboard Hot 100 in December 1974.  As Chapin's only number-one song, it became the best known of his work and a staple for folk rock music. Chapin's recording of the song was nominated for the 1975 Grammy Award for Best Male Pop Vocal Performance and was inducted into the Grammy Hall of Fame in 2011.

Composition and background
"Cat's in the Cradle" is narrated by a man who becomes a father in the first verse. Not long after his son's birth, the father is repeatedly unable to spend time with him due to his job, despite his son looking up to him and saying he will grow up to be just like his father. After the son graduates from college, he declines his father's offer to relax with him and instead asks for the car keys. In the final verse, the now-retired father calls his adult son and asks if they can spend some time together. However, the son's own job and family prevents him from being able to get together, and the father realizes that his son has indeed grown up to be just like him.

The song's lyrics began as a poem written by Harry's wife, Sandra "Sandy" Gaston; the poem itself was inspired by the awkward relationship between her first husband, James Cashmore, and his father, John, a politician who served as Brooklyn borough president. She was also inspired by a country music song she had heard on the radio. Chapin also said the song was about his own relationship with his son, Josh, admitting, "Frankly, this song scares me to death."

Reception
Cash Box called it "a tender story of a father and his son and a perfect representation of how roles change in the relationship over the years," stating it was a "lyrical delight." Record World said that the song  "deals with the preoccupations plaguing parenthood" and that it "bridges the generation gap by pointing up mutual faults."

Charts

Weekly charts

Year-end charts

Certifications

Ugly Kid Joe version

In 1992, American hard rock band Ugly Kid Joe included a cover of the song, renamed "Cats in the Cradle" (without the apostrophe), on their debut album, America's Least Wanted. The cover was issued as a single in 1993 and peaked at number six on the US Billboard Hot 100, the group's highest position on that chart. The song also peaked at number three on the Billboard Album Rock Tracks chart. The single sold 500,000 copies domestically, earning a gold certification from the Recording Industry Association of America. Worldwide, the cover peaked at number one in Australia for a week and reached the top five in Iceland, Ireland, Norway, New Zealand, Sweden and Switzerland, as well as number seven on the UK Singles Chart.

Critical reception
AllMusic editor Stephen Thomas Erlewine remarked the band's "revamped" version of the song. Mary Lynn White from Calgary Herald said their version "proves you're deep too." Jason Fliegel from The Cavalier Daily felt the band has redone the song "in its own unique style". Deborah Frost of Entertainment Weekly called it a "scarily straight" cover. Steve Hochman of Los Angeles Times said, "Turning Harry Chapin's "Cat's in the Cradle" into a power ballad was a bad idea to begin with; making it sound neither snotty nor particularly sincere only compounds the error." Tom Ford from Toledo Blade wrote that they "do an excellent job", "adding power to the sing-song chorus, and a crashing finale that removes its coffeehouse patina."

Charts

Weekly charts

Year-end charts

Decade-end charts

Certifications

Release history

Elsewhere in popular culture
Rapper Darryl "DMC" McDaniels was inspired to rewrite "Cat's in the Cradle" and perform it as "Just Like Me," featuring Sarah McLachlan. The song was released from DMC's album Checks Thugs and Rock n Roll in March 2006; it tells the story of his birth and adoption.

Used in an episode of The Office by Dwight to guilt trip his coworker Jim Halpert into going home to his wife and child; the attempt is almost successful, playing on the clear theme of the relationship between father and son in the song. Ultimately, Dwight's attempt backfires.

In season 4, episode 7 of How I Met Your Mother, Barney Stinson, who was abandoned by his father as a child, performs an emotional rendition of the song at a karaoke bar.

In the movie Shrek the Third, Donkey starts singing the song as their boat departs after Shrek finds out Fiona is pregnant.

The song was used in a 1993 anti-terrorism advert Public Service Advert in Northern Ireland that plays on the song's theme of a father who neglects his son in order to show a terrorist neglecting his family and his son turning out to be like his father and suffering the consequences in dying by going down the same life path. The video ends with the slogan "Don't Suffer It, Change It" and the number of the confidential telephones that were in operation at the time to report terrorist activity in Northern Ireland.

References

External links
 Lyrics at The Harry Chapin Archive
 Guitar Tabs and Chords at Fretbase

1974 singles
1974 songs
1993 singles
Harry Chapin songs
Ricky Skaggs songs
Ugly Kid Joe songs
Billboard Hot 100 number-one singles
Cashbox number-one singles
Number-one singles in Australia
Elektra Records singles
Mercury Records singles
Grammy Hall of Fame Award recipients
Pop ballads
Rock ballads
Song recordings produced by Paul Leka
Songs about fathers
Songs about parenthood
Songs based on poems
Songs written by Harry Chapin